The following is a list of Australian television ratings for the year 2000.

Network shares – 2000 

* Data Gathered by then Ratings Supplier: A.C Neilsen Australia

Most watched broadcasts – 2000 
 Data based on the five Metropolitan markets only.

Top rating regular programmes – 2000 
 Data based on the five Metropolitan markets only.

Weeknight News and Current Affair Readers 2000 
REDIRECT List of Australian TV Newsreaders

Weekly ratings – 2000 
 Data based on the five Metropolitan markets only.

2000
Ratings